The 1972 European Tour was a series of golf tournaments that comprised the Professional Golfers' Association (PGA) tournament circuit. It is officially recognised as the first season of the PGA European Tour.

Historically, the PGA's Order of Merit only included tournaments in Great Britain and Ireland, but in 1970 events in continental Europe were included for the first time. The circuit and organisation evolved further over the following years, adopting the name PGA European Golf Tour in 1979.

The season made up of 20 tournaments counting for the Order of Merit, and some non-counting tournaments that later became known as "Approved Special Events". The schedule included the major national opens around Europe, with other tournaments mostly held in England and Scotland.

The Order of Merit was won by England's Peter Oosterhuis, who also led the standings in prize money and stroke average.

Changes for 1972
There were several changes from the previous year's British PGA circuit schedule, with the inclusion of the Madrid Open, the Dutch Open and the Lancia d'Oro tournament; they joined the five national opens in continental Europe that were included in 1971. Also added were the John Player Trophy and the Scottish Open, and the returning John Player Classic and Sumrie Better-Ball tournaments; lost from the calendar were the Agfa-Gevaert Tournament, the Classic International, the Daks Tournament and the Gallaher Ulster Open.

Schedule
The following table lists official events during the 1972 season.

Unofficial events
The following events were sanctioned by the European Tour, but did not carry official money, nor were wins official.

Order of Merit
The Order of Merit was based on prize money won during the season, calculated using a points-based system.

Awards

See also
List of golfers with most European Tour wins

Notes

References

External links
1972 season results on the PGA European Tour website
1972 Order of Merit on the PGA European Tour website

European Tour seasons
European Tour